"All I Am" is a song by English singer-songwriter Jess Glynne. It was released through Atlantic on 17 August 2018 as the second single from her second studio album, Always in Between (2018). It contains a sample replay of Kings of Tomorrow's 2000 single "Finally" bass line performed and produced by Mark Summers of Scorccio.

Track listing

Charts

Certifications

References

2018 singles
2018 songs
Jess Glynne songs
Song recordings produced by Mark Ralph (record producer)
Songs written by Frances (musician)
Songs written by James Newman (musician)
Songs written by Jess Glynne
Songs written by Jin Jin (musician)